Milne  is a surname of Scottish origin, from the same source as Miller, and may refer to:

Military

 Sir Alexander Milne, 1st Baronet, British admiral
 Archibald Berkeley Milne (1855–1938), admiral of the Royal Navy
 Sir David Milne, British admiral
 Duncan Grinnell-Milne (1896–1973), English First World War pilot
 George Milne, 1st Baron Milne, British field marshal
 John Theobald Milne, English first world war flying ace
 MacGillivray Milne, United States Navy Captain, and the 27th Governor of American Samoa
 William Johnstone Milne, Canadian recipient of the Victoria Cross

Scientists

 Colin Milne, Scottish botanist and priest
 Edward Arthur Milne, British mathematician and astrophysicist
 James Stuart Milne New Zealand mathematician
 John Milne, English geologist
 Malcolm Davenport Milne (1915–1991), physician and medical researcher
 Stephen Milne (mathematician), American mathematician
 William Grant Milne (?–1866), Scottish botanist

Politicians

 Charles Black Milne (1879–1935), Scottish politician, Unionist Party Member of Parliament for West Fife
 Christine Milne, Australian politician
 David Milne (Ontario politician)
 Donald Milne, American politician and lawyer
 Duane Milne, Republican member of the Pennsylvania House of Representatives, representing the 167th legislative district
 Eddie Milne (1915–1983), British Labour Party Member of Parliament for Blyth, later re-elected as an independent candidate
 John Milne (politician) (1839–1922), Canadian Senator and businessman
 John Sydney Wardlaw-Milne (1879–1922), British Conservative Party politician
 Lance Milne (1915–1995), Australian Democrats member of the South Australian Legislative Council
 Lorna Anne Milne, Canadian senator
 Marion Milne, American businesswoman and politician
 Nanette Milne, Scottish Conservative & Unionist Party politician
 Robert Milne (Canadian politician) (1881–1953), Member of Parliament
 Ross Milne (Canadian politician) (born 1932), retired Canadian politician
 Seumas Milne (born 1958), British Labour Party Director of Communications and Strategy, also a journalist and writer
 Sir William Milne (politician) (1822–1895), Australian wine merchant and politician
 William Ross Milne, Canadian politician

In literature

 A. A. Milne, author of Winnie-the-Pooh
 Carly Milne, Canadian writer
 Christian Milne (1773–?), Scottish poet of the Romantic Era
 Christopher Robin Milne, son of A. A. Milne, appearing as Christopher Robin in Winnie the Pooh
 Drew Milne, British poet and academic
 Ewart Milne, Irish poet who was in the Spanish Civil War
 Frances Margaret Milne (1846-?; pseudonym, "Margaret Frances"), Irish-born, American writer, librarian
 John Clark Milne (1897–1962), Scottish poet who wrote in the Doric dialect of the Scots language.
 Mary Christianna Milne Lewis, British mystery writer and children's author who wrote as Christianna Brand
 Robert Duncan Milne (1844–1899), American science fiction writer

Sport
 Alec Milne, Scottish footballer who played for Cardiff City
 Alec Milne (footballer born 1889), footballer who played in the Football League for Doncaster Rovers and Stoke
 Andrew Milne (born 1990), professional footballer
 Arthur Milne (footballer) (1915–1997), Scottish association football player, played for Dundee United, Hibs and St. Mirren
 Athol Milne, Australian rules footballer
 Billy Milne, Scottish footballer who played for Arsenal
 Brian Milne (born 1973), American NFL football fullback
 Callum Milne (born 1965), Scottish footballer
 Cordy Milne (1914–1937), American motorcycle speedway rider
 David Milne (rugby league), Australian Rugby League player
 David Milne (rugby union), former Scottish international rugby union player
 Dax Milne (born 1999), American football player
 Elizabeth Milne (born 1990), New Zealand football player
 Fiona Milne, Canadian rower
 Gordon Milne (born 1937), English former footballer and football manager
 Herbert Milne (born 1884), Australian rules footballer
 Iain Milne (born 1958), former Scotland rugby union footballer
 Jack Milne (speedway rider) (1907–1995), international speedway rider
 Jackie Milne (born 1911), Scottish footballer
 Jimmy Milne (footballer, born 1911), Scotland player and manager
 Kenny Milne (footballer) (born 1979), Scottish professional footballer with Scunthorpe United
 Kenny Milne (rugby union) (born 1961), former Scotland rugby union player
 Lachie Milne (born 1978), Australian slalom canoer
 Leslie Milne (field hockey) (born 1956), US field hockey player
 Malcolm Milne (born 1948), Australian Olympic skier
 Pete Milne, former Major League Baseball outfielder
 Ralph Milne, Scottish footballer with Dundee United and Manchester United
 Ray Milne, former Scottish–U.S. soccer defender
 Riley Milne, Australian rules footballer with Hawthorn
 Robert Milne (footballer), Scottish-born footballer who played for Ireland
 Rod Milne (Athlete), Great Britain Olympic 4x400m Relay Finalist
 Ross Milne, Australian Olympic downhill skier
 Shawn Milne (born 1981), American road bicycle racer
 Stephen Milne (born 1980), Australian rules footballer
 Steven Milne (born 1980), Scottish footballer
 Taane Milne, Australian rugby player
 Vic Milne (1897–1971), footballer who played Aston Villa
 Wilfred Milne (born 1899), English former professional footballer
 William Milne (sport shooter) (born 1852), British Olympic sport shooter

Other

 Alasdair Milne, former Director-General of the BBC
 Alex Milne (artist), comic book artist
 Alexander Milne (civil servant), British civil servant
 Alexander Milne (entrepreneur), entrepreneur
 Andy Milne, Canadian jazz pianist and composer in New York
 Anna-Louise Milne, specialist of Twentieth Century Parisian History and Culture
 Christopher Milne (born 1950), Australian actor and award-winning writer
 Dan Milne, British actor/director who is possibly best known for his role in EastEnders
 David Milne (artist) (1882–1953), Canadian painter
 Frank Kenneth Milne (1885–1980), South Australian architect, responsible for major refurbishment of the Regal Theatre, Kensington Park 
 Glenn Milne, News Ltd. journalist and National Press Club vice-president
 Hamish Milne (1939–2020), British pianist and a professor of Music
 Lawrence Arabia, real name James Milne, solo artist and bassist for Okkervil River
 James Lees-Milne (1908–1997), English writer and expert on country houses
 Jennifer Keeler-Milne (born 1961), Australian contemporary artist
 Jimmy Milne (trade unionist), STUC General Secretary
 John Milne (journalist), retired BBC Scotland presenter
 Joshua Milne (1776–1851), English actuary
 Kevin Milne (born 1949), New Zealand television presenter
 Kirsty Milne (1964–2013), English-born Scottish journalist
 Mrs. Leslie Milne (1860–1932), English traveler in Northern Burma
 Milne & Co, South Australian wine merchants
 Paula Milne, British screenwriter who has been active since the 1970s
 Robert Milne known as Robert Lyon (Australian settler), advocate of Australian Aboriginal rights 
 Ronald Milne (born 1957), British librarian and administrator
 Stewart Milne (born 1950), businessman from Alford, Aberdeenshire, Scotland
 Tom Milne (1926–2005), British film critic
 Walter Milne (died 1558), the last Protestant martyr to be burned in Scotland
 William Milne (missionary) (1782–1834), British Protestant missionary to China
 William J. Milne (educator) (1843–1914), American educator

See also
 Henri Milne-Edwards (1800–1885), French zoologist, father of Alphonse Milne-Edwards
 Alphonse Milne-Edwards (1835–1900), French zoologist, son of Henri Milne-Edwards
 Miln, including
 Barnaby Miln (born 1947), social activist
 James Miln (1819–1881), Scottish antiquary
 Milner
 Milnes
 Mylne

English-language surnames
Occupational surnames
Surnames of Scottish origin
English-language occupational surnames

de:Milne